The Aeshnidae, also called aeshnids, hawkers, or darners, is a family of dragonflies. The family includes the largest dragonflies found in North America and Europe and among the largest dragonflies on the planet.

Description
Common worldwide or nearly worldwide genera are Aeshna and Anax. The African Anax tristis has a wingspan over 125 mm, making it one of the world's largest known dragonflies.

There are 41 North American species in 11 genera in this family. Most European species belong to Aeshna. Their American name "darner" stems from the female abdomens looking like a sewing needle, as they cut into plant stem when they lay their eggs through the ovipositor.

The dragonflies mate in flight. The eggs are deposited in water or close by. The larvae (nymphs or naiads) are generally slender compared to those of other families, with a long and flat extensible lower lip (labium). The larvae are aquatic predators, feeding on other insects and even small fish.

The adults spend large amounts of time in the air and seem to fly tirelessly with their four large and powerful wings. They can fly forwards or backwards or hover like a helicopter. The wings are always extended horizontally.

Their abdomens are long and thin. Most are colored blue and or green, with black and occasionally yellow. Their large, hemispherical, compound eyes touch in the midline and nearly cover their heads. They have an extremely good sight, and are voracious insect predators, using their sharp, biting mouthparts. They are, therefore, very beneficial.

All are extremely hard to catch because of their flying abilities and keen sight.

A proposal has been made to split this family into Aeshnidae and Telephlebiidae.

The name may have resulted from a printer's error in spelling the Greek Aechma, "a spear". The spelling Aeschnidae has been intermittently used over a period of time, but is now abandoned for the original name Aeshnidae. However, derived genus names (such as Rhionaeschna) retain the 'sch' spelling, as this is how they were first cited.

Genera

See also
 List of dragonflies (Aeshnidae)

References

Silsby, Jill (2001). Dragonflies of the World. Smithsonian Institution Press, Washington D.C.

External links

List of Anisoptera of the World

H

 
Aeshnoidea
Odonata of Asia
Odonata of Africa
Odonata of Australia
Odonata of Europe
Odonata of Oceania
Odonata of North America
Odonata of South America
Taxa named by Jules Pierre Rambur
Odonata families